Eugene Jao (born 9 November 1957) is a Taiwanese politician. He was a member of the Legislative Yuan between 1993 and 2008. Jao began his political career as a member of the Kuomintang before leaving the party in 2000. He switched affiliations to the Democratic Progressive Party in 2002. He has served on the Control Yuan since 2018.

Education
Jao graduated from the Affiliated Senior High School of National Taiwan Normal University and earned bachelor's and master's degree in political science from National Chengchi University in Taiwan and New York University in the United States, respectively.

Political career
Jao joined the Kuomintang due to the influence of his father, Jao Chang-chiang, and brother, both senior party members. Jao was first elected to the Legislative Yuan in 1992. In 1996, during Jao's second term, he received repeated death threats from fellow legislator Lo Fu-chu, who opposed anti-corruption bills Jao supported. Jao remained popular entering his third legislative term due to his tendency to challenge his party caucus. In the 1998 election cycle, Jao received the most votes of any candidate in Taipei County. A conflict of interest bill Jao backed as part of his anti-corruption crusade became law in June 2000. Later that year, he joined a task force which discussed the state of Cross-Strait relations in context of the 1992 Consensus. Jao vehemently opposed the activation of the Lungmen Nuclear Power Plant discussed in October. Shortly thereafter, the Kuomintang suspended Jao's membership. Jao subsequently formed an independent legislative caucus, for which the KMT revoked his membership. After spending some time as an independent, Jao began his fourth legislative term as a member of the Democratic Progressive Party caucus. In March 2002, he was named chief executive of a legislative task force called to consider passage of sunshine laws. That July, Jao formally joined the Democratic Progressive Party. During his fifth legislative term, Jao served as DPP caucus whip. In 2006, Jao backed a proposed bill to regulate the Kuomintang's assets. He lost reelection in 2008. The Tsai Ing-wen administration nominated Jao to a seat on the Control Yuan in 2017. He faced interpellation in January 2018 and took office with legislative consent. He was renominated in June 2020. Despite Kuomintang opposition to the number of Pan-Green nominees, all 26 nominations were confirmed.

Political stances
Over the course of his legislative career, Jao has taken an interest in genetically modified food, and food safety. A noted environmentalist, Jao has been active in discussions about energy policy and water use. He is opposed to the use of nuclear power. Jao is also known for his interest in endangered species such as the black-faced spoonbill.

Controversy 
Jao was one of five DPP politicians whom Chang Che-shen accused of slander in 2006. Next Magazine first reported in 2007 that Jao had taken bribes from the National Chinese Herbal Apothecary Association in 1998. In January 2008, Jao was one of eight lawmakers charged with taking bribes, from the National Chinese Herbal Apothecary Association in 1998 and the Taiwan Dental Association in 2003, in violation of the Pharmaceutical Affairs Law. The Taipei District Court ruled in 2009 that Jao was not guilty of the charges dating back to 1998. Upon appeal to the Taiwan High Court, Jao was sentenced to eight years imprisonment. His sentence for the charges stemming from 2003 was set at ninety months imprisonment in 2011. The Supreme Court issued the final ruling on the case in 2016, deciding that Jao was not guilty of accepting bribes from the Taiwan Dental Association.

References

1957 births
Living people
New Taipei Members of the Legislative Yuan
Kuomintang Members of the Legislative Yuan in Taiwan
Democratic Progressive Party Members of the Legislative Yuan
Members of the 2nd Legislative Yuan
Members of the 3rd Legislative Yuan
Members of the 4th Legislative Yuan
Members of the 5th Legislative Yuan
Members of the 6th Legislative Yuan
National Chengchi University alumni
New York University alumni
Taiwanese environmentalists
Taiwanese anti–nuclear power activists
Taiwanese politicians convicted of bribery
Taiwanese Members of the Control Yuan